The 1st Proletarian Corps was a Yugoslav Partisan corps that fought against the Germans, Independent State of Croatia (NDH) and Chetniks in occupied Democratic Federal Yugoslavia during World War II. 

It was created on 5 October 1943 from the 1st Proletarian and 6th "Nikola Tesla" Divisions. On 15 September 1944 the "Operational Group of divisions" (5th, 17th and 21st Divisions) became also part of the 1st Corps. Its first commander was Koča Popović, succeeded in July 1944 by Peko Dapčević.

Until the middle of June 1944, the 1st (Proletarian) Corps operated in Western and Central Bosnia and Lika, where it fought heavy battles with units of the German 15th Mountain, 5th SS Mountain and 69th Corps. In 1943-1944, it participated in the Banja Luka Operation and Drvar Operation. In May 1944 it withstood the German Operation Rösselsprung (1944). 
In August 1944 it made an attack over Zlatibor into Serbia and defeated the Chetniks at Maljen and Suvobor.
In autumn 1944, it fought in the Belgrade operation and then on the Syrmian Front.

On 1 January 1945 the 1st Corps was reformed into the 1st Army.

Sources 
vojska.net

Corps of the Yugoslav Partisans
Military units and formations established in 1943
Military units and formations disestablished in 1945